AireSpring is a super-carrier operating worldwide and nationwide managed services who provides cloud communications and managed connectivity services to businesses.  Headquartered in Clearwater, Florida, the company provides managed services including unified communications, voice, data, security, failover, network management and IP services to around 14,000 small, medium-sized, and multi-location enterprises in more than 80 major metropolitan markets across the United States.

History 
AireSpring was founded in 2001 by Avi, Daniel, and David Lonstein who in 1997 sold ADDTEL Communications, Inc., their privately held company who resold switched long distance, to SA Communications, Inc.   The Lonstein brothers reinvested a portion of their returns into a new company whose sole focus was on the small to medium-sized business and multi-location enterprise market and called it AireSpring. The company began where they left off, selling switched long distance services. Since then, AireSpring has expanded its portfolio to include local phone service, dedicated internet, ethernet, MPLS VPN, SD-WAN, Cloud Connectivity, Managed Security (firewalls, DDoS mitigation) and VoIP/SIP trunking services.

In 2014, AireSpring acquired hosted contact center provider, simplyCT.

Network 
AireSpring is a facilities-based network provider in the United States and operates a nationwide network.  AireSpring offers SD-WAN, SIP and Internet services worldwide.  When AireSpring customers are located in an area that cannot access the network directly, AireSpring leverages one of its wholesale agreements with AT&T, Verizon Business, XO Communications, Level 3 Communications, Windstream, or CenturyLink, and dozens of other carriers for last-mile connectivity.

Services 
The company offers a broad range of services to its business and wholesale customers. These services include:
 Long-distance voice services
 Dedicated internet access
 MPLS IP-VPN
 SIP
 SIP trunking
 Ethernet
 Hosted IP-PBX

Distribution channels
AireSpring sells its services through two channels:  the indirect sales channel and the wholesale division.

References

External links
 Official Company Web Site

Technology companies established in 2002
VoIP companies of the United States
Internet service providers of the United States
Telecommunications companies of the United States
2002 establishments in California